Spencer Gordon Steer (born December 7, 1997) is an American professional baseball infielder for the Cincinnati Reds of Major League Baseball (MLB).

Amateur career
Steer attended Millikan High School in Long Beach, California. He was drafted by the Cleveland Indians in the 29th round of the 2016 Major League Baseball draft but did not sign and played college baseball at the University of Oregon. In 2018, he played collegiate summer baseball with the Orleans Firebirds of the Cape Cod Baseball League. Steer was selected by the Minnesota Twins in the third round of the 2019 MLB draft.

Professional career

Minnesota Twins
Steer made his professional debut Elizabethton Twins and Cedar Rapids Kernels. He did not play a minor league game in 2020 because the season was cancelled due to the COVID-19 pandemic. He started 2021 with Cedar Rapids before being promoted to the Wichita Wind Surge. Over 110 games between the two teams, Steer slashed .254/.348/.484 with 24 home runs and 66 RBIs.

Cincinnati Reds

On August 2, 2022, the Twins traded Steer, Steve Hajjar, and Christian Encarnacion-Strand, to the Cincinnati Reds in exchange for Tyler Mahle.

On September 1, 2022, the Reds selected Steer's contract and promoted him to the major leagues. He made his debut the next day, going 2 for 2 with a home run for his first Major League hit, a double, and walking twice. In the 28 games Steer appeared in, he ended the season slashing .211/.306/.326.

References

External links

1997 births
Living people
Baseball players from Long Beach, California
Cedar Rapids Kernels players
Cincinnati Reds players
Elizabethton Twins players
Louisville Bats players
Major League Baseball infielders
Oregon Ducks baseball players
Orleans Firebirds players
Sportspeople from Long Beach, California
St. Paul Saints players
Wichita Wind Surge players